Westmead is a suburb in Sydney, in the state of New South Wales, Australia. Westmead is located 26 kilometres west of the Sydney central business district in the local government area of Cumberland Council and is part of the Greater Western Sydney region.

Geography

Westmead is bounded by the Parramatta River, Toongabbie Creek and Finlayson Creek in the north. On the east it is bounded by Parramatta Park, the Parramatta Golf Club, Amos Street and Good Street. The southern boundary is the Great Western Highway. The western boundary is Bridge Road, the railway line and Finlayson Creek.

History 
With the British settlement of Parramatta, Westmead was originally part of the domain of Government House. What is left of this domain, including Government House, form Parramatta Park. The name Westmead came into use when the governor's domain was first subdivided in 1859. The subdivision of the domain was completed in 1889. The Northern Meadow and Western Meadow of the domain were split off and called Northmead and Westmead. From this time orchards were established by many new settlers, including some whose names were well known in the Parramatta area – George Oakes, Nat Payten and William Fullagar among them.

Parramatta Marist School was established by Fr. John Therry in Hunter Street Parramatta in 1820, under the direction of Mr. George Morley. The school was transferred to the site of the present junior school in 1837 and entrusted to the care of the Marist Brothers in 1875. This makes Parramatta Marist the oldest Catholic school in Australia.

Heritage listings 
Westmead has a number of heritage-listed sites, including:
 2, 4, 6, and 8 Bridge Road: Essington

Health

Health is the major employer in the area, with large public hospitals for both adults and children, a mental health hospital, a private hospital and three medical research facilities spanning basic, genetic and molecular science for both adults and children. A community foundation supports fundraising and awareness activities of Westmead.
 CareFlight, an adult medical retrieval service
 Children's Medical Research Institute
 Cumberland Hospital, a psychiatric hospital
 NETS, an intensive care service for neonates
 The Children's Hospital at Westmead (also called the Royal Alexandra Hospital for Children or Sydney Children's Hospital Network, Westmead)
 Westmead Centre for Oral Health
 Westmead Hospital, a major University of Sydney teaching hospital, which was opened in November 1978
 Westmead Medical Research Foundation
 Westmead Millennium Institute for Medical Research

Education 

 The University of Sydney Westmead campus is home to around 2,000 students who are conducting study, research or clinical placements at Westmead, and close to 1,000 staff members and affiliates.
Western Sydney University (WSU).
 WSU College, Westmead Campus.
 Westmead Public School was established in 1917, when an Infants' School opened in a rented Church of England hall in April of that year. By 1919 the present site was acquired, and the first purpose-built school building was opened in May 1920. In 1923 the building was extended to provide accommodation for Primary students. Within two years the growing local population created demand for additional accommodation for Primary students. At the present day Westmead Public School is one of the best primary schools in NSW, with high academic, sporting and art achievements. It schools over 900 children and has many professional teachers and staff.
 The Catherine McAuley Catholic High School is an all Girls school located on the same campus as Parramatta Marist High School
 Parramatta Marist High School is the oldest Catholic school in Australia, established in 1820.
 Sacred Heart Primary School
 Westmead Christian Grammar School (formerly Essington Christian Academy) was established at the site of Essington House in 1983. It provides a Christian Education for students from Kindergarten through to Year 6.

Transport 
Westmead railway station is on the North Shore & Western Line of the Sydney Trains network.

The Western railway line from Parramatta to Blacktown was built through the suburb in 1861. A railway station at Westmead was opened in April 1893 after a successful petition by local residents.

A bus transitway, the North-West T-way, services Westmead from both Parramatta and The Hills District.

Future public transport services include a light rail and a metro. The two-line Parramatta Light Rail project was announced in 2015. Westmead will be the terminus of both lines, which will operate to Carlingford and Sydney Olympic Park. In 2018 it was announced that Westmead would be the terminus of the Sydney Metro West line.

Demographics
Of these: 
 Age distribution: Residents were notably younger than the country overall.  The median age was 33 years, compared to the national median of 38 years. Children aged under 15 years made up 22.3% of the population (national average is 18.7%) and people aged 65 years and over made up just 8.9% of the population (national average is 15.8%).
  Ethnic diversity : Just over on quarter (25.4%) were born in Australia, compared to the national average of 70%; the next most common countries of birth were India 36.3%, China 4.8%, Sri Lanka 4.2%, Philippines 2.0% and Nepal 2.0%.  At home, 20.8% of residents only spoke English; other languages spoken at home included Hindi 10.1%, Tamil 8.7%, Gujarati 7.5%, Telugu 6.8% and Mandarin 4.5%.
 Finances: The median household weekly income was $1,866, more than the national median of $1,438. This difference is also reflected in real estate prices, with the median mortgage payment in Westmead being $2,000 per month, compared to the national median of $1,755.
 Housing: More than two-thirds (70.8%) of occupied private dwellings were flats, units or apartments; 17% were separate houses, and 11.3% were semi-detached (row or terrace houses, townhouses etc.). The average household size was 2.8 people.
 Religion: The most common religious affiliations were Hinduism 40.8%, Catholic 12.3% and No Religion 11.3%.

References

External links

 Westmead Hospital

Suburbs of Sydney
Cumberland Council, New South Wales
City of Parramatta